The Canton of Charenton-du-Cher is a former canton situated in the Cher département and in the Centre region of France. It was disbanded following the French canton reorganisation which came into effect in March 2015. It consisted of 9 communes, which joined the canton of Dun-sur-Auron in 2015. It had 3,961 inhabitants (2012).

Geography
An area of lakes and rivers, farming and forestry in the eastern part of the arrondissement of Saint-Amand-Montrond centred on the town of Charenton-du-Cher. The altitude varies from 153 m at Coust to 308 m at Arpheuilles, with an average altitude of 190 m.

The canton comprised 9 communes:

Arpheuilles
Bannegon
Bessais-le-Fromental
Charenton-du-Cher
Coust
Le Pondy
Saint-Pierre-les-Étieux
Thaumiers
Vernais

Population

See also
 Arrondissements of the Cher department
 Cantons of the Cher department
 Communes of the Cher department

References

Charenton-du-Cher
2015 disestablishments in France
States and territories disestablished in 2015